This is a list of places in the United States named for DeWitt Clinton. His role in the construction of the Erie Canal created accessible Eastern seaboard markets for Midwestern agriculture and he was widely admired by settlers, especially those hailing from New York.

Some of these places may have been named for both DeWitt Clinton and his uncle George Clinton, an important figure in the founding of the United States.

Counties and municipalities
Clinton County, Illinois
Clinton County, Indiana
Clinton County, Iowa
Clinton County, Kentucky
Clinton County, Michigan
Clinton County, Missouri
Clinton County, Pennsylvania
DeWitt County, Illinois
Clinton Charter Township, Michigan
Clinton Township, Lenawee County, Michigan
Clinton Township, New Jersey
City of Clinton, Arkansas
City of Clinton, Indiana
City of Clinton, Illinois
City of Clinton, Iowa
City of Clinton, Missouri
City of Clinton, Mississippi
Community of Clinton, Pennsylvania
City of DeWitt, Arkansas
City of DeWitt, Iowa
Town of Clinton, Louisiana
Town of Clinton, Massachusetts
City of DeWitt, Michigan
Town of Clinton, New Jersey
Town of Clinton, Rock County, Wisconsin
Village of Clinton, Lenawee County, Michigan
Village of DeWitt, Illinois
Village of Clinton, Kansas
Village of Clinton, Wisconsin
Village of Clintonville, KY
Town of Clinton, Connecticut
City of Port Clinton, Ohio
Borough of Port Clinton, Pennsylvania
Town of Clinton, Kentucky
City of Clinton, Tennessee
City of Clinton, Maryland

Streets and parks 
Clinton Avenue and Clinton Square in Albany, New York
Clinton Avenue in Fair Haven, Connecticut
Clinton St. in Chicago (which benefited greatly from the Erie Canal)
Clinton St. in Fort Wayne, Indiana
Clinton Square, Syracuse, New York
DeWitt Clinton Park, Manhattan (located in the Clinton neighborhood)
DeWitt's Dog Run, Manhattan (a dog run located within DeWitt Clinton Park)
DeWitt Road, Webster, New York
Clintonville Street, Whitestone, New York
DeWitt Avenue East New York, Brooklyn
Clinton St. in Grand Mound, Iowa

Schools
DeWitt Clinton High School, Bronx, New York City
DeWitt Clinton School, Chicago, Illinois
DeWitt Clinton Elementary School, Detroit, Michigan (which features a mural on American history painted by Diego Rivera)
Clinton Hall, a graduate student dormitory at SUNY Buffalo
DeWitt Road Elementary School, Webster, New York

Other
Clinton, a neighborhood on the west side of Manhattan also known as Hell's Kitchen.
Clinton House, Ithaca, New York (former hotel adjacent to the Ithaca Commons).
Clinton River in Michigan
Clinton String Quartet of Syracuse, New York
DeWitt Clinton Lodge of Sandwich, Massachusetts
DeWitt Clinton Masonic Lodge #141 Goochland, Virginia
Former Dewitt Clinton Hotel (now Dewitt Clinton Apartments) in Albany, NY
Governor DeWitt Clinton Houses, a New York City Housing Authority (NYCHA) development located in Harlem, Manhattan.
Clinton Grove in Weare, NH and Clinton Grove Academy, also in Weare, NH.
The Dewitt Clinton - Apartment building in Astoria, Queens, NYC built c. 1928

See also
 DeWitt Clinton was also the name of the first steam locomotive to operate in New York; it ran between Albany and Schenectady, New York.

References

Clinton, DeWitt place names
Clinton, DeWitt
Clinton, DeWitt